Vijila Sathyananth is an Indian politician, Educationalist and former Mayor of Tirunelveli Municipal Corporation. She represents Dravida Munnetra Kazhagam party. She also represents as a member in the party's general council. She is also a member in Rajya Sabha from 2014-20.She joined the DMK.

References 

All India Anna Dravida Munnetra Kazhagam politicians
Dravida Munnetra Kazhagam politicians
Living people
Rajya Sabha members from Tamil Nadu
Women in Tamil Nadu politics
21st-century Indian women politicians
21st-century Indian politicians
Women members of the Rajya Sabha
Year of birth missing (living people)
People from Tirunelveli